Allipén River is a river located in the La Araucanía Region of Chile. It is formed at the junction of the rivers Trufultruful and Zahuelhue, near Melipeuco. The basin of the river comprises approximately 36 percent of the Conguillío National Park surface area (including a 5-km-wide buffer zone  around the park).

Allipén's main tributary is Curaco River, which receives the waters of Colico Lake through the river of the same name.

References

Rivers of Araucanía Region
Rivers of Chile